La Colosa is a porphyry gold mine in Colombia. The mine is located in Cajamarca, Tolima on the eastern flanks of the Central Ranges of the Colombian Andes. In 2015, the mine produced  of gold. In 2016, 88.4% of the mining value in Colombia came from coal and gold combined, with nickel following at 9.3%.

Description 
La Colosa gold project, started in 2006, is based on low-grade porphyry copper deposits containing a small amount of gold. Gold grains in the deposit are found both liberated and locked in sulphides and silicates. The gold mineralization in the deposit is attributed to porphyry intrusions into the Paleozoic schists of the Cajamarca Complex on the eastern flank of the Central Ranges of the Colombian Andes, around 8 Ma. Gold mineralization is believed to have occurred over three early phases of intrusion, which are accompanied by a series of potassic and sodic-calcic alteration events and a late phase of dacite porphyry intrusions.

See also 

 List of mining areas in Colombia
 Quinchía mine
 Cerro Matoso mine

References

Bibliography

Maps 
 

Gold mines in Colombia
Surface mines in Colombia
Buildings and structures in Tolima Department
2006 establishments in Colombia